Francis Woodward may refer to:

Francis Woodward (Australian politician) (1846–1905), New South Wales politician
Francis H. Woodward (born 1939), Massachusetts politician